Vincent Waydell "Vince" Warner, junior was bishop of the Episcopal Diocese of Olympia from 1990 to 2007.

In 2003, Warner received the Bishop's Award of the National Episcopal Archivists and Historians.

In 2011, Katharine Jefferts Schori, the Presiding Bishop, restricted Warner from the exercise of his ministry during an investigation into a "credible allegation of recurrent marital infidelity." In 2012, the House of Bishops issued an accord for Warner "to not act as a bishop effective February 14, 2012."

External links
House of Bishops minutes
Bishop Accused of Recurrent Infidelity, November 15, 2011 article from The Living Church.

Living people
American Episcopal priests
Year of birth missing (living people)
Episcopal bishops of Olympia